Bangladesh Jatiotabadi Mohila Dal is the women's wing of the Bangladesh Nationalist Party. Afroza Abbas is the President of Bangladesh Jatiotabadi Mohila Dal and general secretary of Sultana Ahemed

History 
Bangladesh Jatiotabadi Mohila Dal was established on 9 September 1978.

Shahida Akhter Rita, a Bangladesh Jatiotabadi Mohila Dal politician and the only woman candidate in Jamalpur District, lost the election from Jamalpur-1 in December 2008.

In March 2010, Noor-e-Ara Safa was elected President and Shirin Sultana was elected General Secretary of the Bangladesh Jatiotabadi Mohila Dal.

Activists of Bangladesh Jatiotabadi Mohila Dal protested in Tangail District on 6 January 2013 protesting the gang rape of a student of Major General Mahmudul Hasan High School.

Bangladesh High Court granted bail to Afroza Abbas and Sultana Ahmed, President and General Secretary of Bangladesh Jatiotabadi Mohila Dal on 12 February 2018. Abbas was set to contest the 2018 parliamentary election from Dhaka-9. Abbas is the wife Mirza Abbas, Bangladesh Nationalist Party politician and former minister. In November 2018, Bangladesh Nationalist Party activists were detained by Bangladesh Police from the residence of Abbas. The President of Chittagong unit of Jatiotabadi Mohila Dal was detained by Bangladesh Police in August 2018 for allegedly provoking students who were protesting.

Ten people were injured in violent fractional clashes of Bangladesh Jatiotabadi Mohila Dal in Chittagong in February 2020.

Afroza Abbas, President of Bangladesh Jatiotabadi Mohila Dal, told the media that the Awami League government would be washed away by the floods in July 2022. Various district committees of the dal were organized. Seema Chowdhury, granddaughter of Abdul Hamid Khan Bhashani, was elected president of Naogaon District unit of Bangladesh Jatiotabadi Mohila Dal. On 11 March, 12 members protested outside the organizations central headquarters calling for the removal of Afroza Abbas, President of Bangladesh Jatiotabadi Mohila Dal, and subsequently all 12 members were expelled from the organization. Police prevent protests by Mohila Dal regarding inflation at the Jatiya Press Club on 14 March 2022.

References 

Bangladesh Nationalist Party
1978 establishments in Bangladesh
Nationalism in Asia
Women's wings of political parties